Nabû-šuma-ukîn II, inscribed m[d]Nabû-šuma-úkîn or mŠuma-[úkîn], whose complete name is only known from the Kinglist A, was a usurper and briefly king of Babylon for one month and two days during 732 BC before he was swept aside by his successor, Nabû-mukin-zēri.

Biography

His reign was so fleeting he was omitted from the ''Ptolemaic Canon''. His Assyrian contemporary was Tukultī-apil-Ešarra III who was too distracted campaigning in Syria to react to political events. He came to power as a disaffected former provincial governor leading a rebellion against Nabû-nādin-zēri, the son and successor of Nabû-Nasir.

He was deposed and replaced by the Chaldean chief, Nabû-mukin-zēri, of the Bīt-Amukani tribe, within weeks establishing a trend as later pretenders from the traditional Babylonian population were likewise to be displaced quickly by Chaldeans, Marduk-zakir-šumi II by Marduk-apla-iddina II in 703 BC and Nergal-ušezib by Mušezib-Marduk in 692 BC.

Inscriptions

References

8th-century BC Babylonian kings
8th-century BC rulers